Mohannad Khairullah Ahmed Al-Sulaiman (born July 25, 1993) is a Jordanian footballer who is a defender for Saudi Arabian club Al-Ain.

International career
Mohannad's first international match with the Jordan national team was against United Arab Emirates in 2016 King's Cup on June 3, 2016 in Bangkok, when Jordan won 3–1.

International goals

Senior team

International career statistics

References

External links 

Living people
Jordan international footballers
Jordan youth international footballers
Sportspeople from Amman
Jordanian Pro League players
Saudi First Division League players
Al-Wehdat SC players
Al-Ramtha SC players
Al-Jazeera (Jordan) players
Al-Ain FC (Saudi Arabia) players
1993 births
Jordanian footballers
Association football defenders
Footballers at the 2014 Asian Games
Asian Games competitors for Jordan
Jordanian expatriate footballers
Expatriate footballers in Saudi Arabia
Jordanian expatriate sportspeople in Saudi Arabia